Bellepoint or Belle Point may refer to:

Belle Point, Kentucky, an unincorporated community in Lee County
Bellepoint, Ohio, an unincorporated community
Bellepoint, West Virginia, an unincorporated community in Summers County

See also
Bell Point